The Rallye Alsace-Vosges is a rally competition held in the Vosges, in northeastern France, between Épinal and Saint-Dié-des-Vosges. The event, first held in 1984, is a round of the French championship.

Winners

References

External links
Rallye Alsace-Vosges Ville d'Epinal

Alsace-Vosges
Sport in Vosges (department)